Cathy Belton is an Irish actress who has appeared in a wide range of stage, film, radio and television productions. Born in the west of Ireland, she is a graduate of Trinity College, Dublin. Her stage work includes many productions in the Abbey Theatre and Gate Theatre. Her television work includes Maura O'Brien in Roy, The Clinic, Glenroe, Red Rock, and Paths to Freedom. She has also appeared in films such as The Tiger's Tail and Intermission.

Belton was nominated for Best Actress at the 2015 IFTA Television Awards, for her performance in Red Rock.

Filmography

Film

Television

Radio

References

External links
 

Irish film actresses
Living people
Irish stage actresses
Irish television actresses
Actresses from Galway (city)
Alumni of Trinity College Dublin
21st-century Irish actresses
Year of birth missing (living people)